The Commander-in-chief of the Imperial Japanese Army and Navy was the highest rank of the Imperial Japanese Army and the Imperial Japanese Navy from the 1870s to 1945, when the Empire of Japan was dissolved. The rank was only ever held by the Emperor of Japan as commander-in-chief of the Empire's Armed Forces and, separately, the highest-ranking officer in each of the Armed Services. It formally became obsolete in 1947 when the Imperial Japanese armed forces were abolished.

History 

Decree No. 252 by the Dajokan, dated 7 September 1872 first made formal mention of the rank of dai-gensui; however, no appointments to the rank were made before the rank was abolished along with that of gensui on 8 May 1873. By "Draft Ordinance No. 142" of the Constitution of the Empire of Japan (Chapter 1 Part 1) of 30 September 1889, the Emperor was officially given the rank of dai-gensui and installed as supreme commander of the Army and Navy.

The kanji characters also refer to a Buddhist deity, Daigensui Myō'ō (大元帥明王), a Wisdom King worshipped by the Imperial Court since Emperor Ninmyō and by the Shingon sect, for its legendary miraculous power to quell foreign enemies and rebellions, just like a military leader.

Insignia
The insignia of a dai-gensui were identical to those of a full general, with the addition of the gold imperial chrysanthemum.

List of holders

See also
Other pronunciations of the characters 大元帥
Da yuan shuai in Chinese
Taewonsu, the Korean equivalent
The higher rank of gensui (元帥)
Yuan shuai, the original Chinese title
Wonsu, the Korean equivalent

References
 This article incorporates information from the corresponding article in the Japanese Wikipedia.
 Donald Keene, Emperor of Japan, Meiji and his World 1852–1912

Military ranks of Japan